Campobello di Licata is a comune (municipality) in the Province of Agrigento in the Italian region Sicily, located about  southeast of Palermo and about  east of Agrigento.

Physical geography

Territory 
Campobello di Licata is a hilly town in the province of Agrigento , located on a plateau of the Salso river valley at 316 m above sea level. The territory, which has an extension of about 80 km², borders with Ravanusa, Naro and Licata; the resident population is 9,616 inhabitants; it is 51 km from the provincial capital.

Its borders are delimited to the west by the Canale torrent and to the east by the Milici torrent. Furthermore, Campobello di Licata is only 4 km from Ravanusa.

History
In the 11th century, the Castello di Bifar was built in Campobello di Licata. It was destroyed in the earthquake of 1693.

Contemporary Age 
Important public works are from the end of the 19th century, mainly by the mayor Salvatore Ciotta: drinking water fountains, library, municipal band, school classrooms, petroleum lighting, the facade of the mother church, the municipal clock, the pavements of the streets, the cemetery and the municipal villa.

In 1980 a major restructuring of the town began in Campobello di Licata, monuments were created by the Argentine artist Silvio Benedetto and services and structures of a modern town with a coherent and stylistically unitary vision.

Symbols 
The coat of arms and the banner of the municipality of Campobello di Licata were granted with the royal decree of 12 March 1931.

Geography
Campobello di Licata borders the following municipalities: Licata, Naro, Ravanusa and Canicattì.

References

External links

 Official website
Full history 

Cities and towns in Sicily